Rodriguez's harvest mouse (Reithrodontomys rodriguezi) is a species of rodent in the family Cricetidae.
It is found only in Costa Rica.

References

Musser, G. G. and M. D. Carleton. 2005. Superfamily Muroidea. pp. 894–1531 in Mammal Species of the World a Taxonomic and Geographic Reference. D. E. Wilson and D. M. Reeder eds. Johns Hopkins University Press, Baltimore.

Reithrodontomys
Rodents of Central America
Mammals described in 1943
Taxonomy articles created by Polbot